The Alfréd Rényi Institute of Mathematics is the research institute in mathematics of the Hungarian Academy of Sciences. It was created in 1950 by Alfréd Rényi, who directed it until his death. Since its creation, the institute has been the center of mathematical research in Hungary. It received the title Centre of Excellence of the European Union (2001). The current director is  András Stipsicz. The institute publishes the research journal Studia Scientiarum Mathematicarum Hungarica.

Research divisions and research groups
 Algebra (head: Mátyás Domokos)
 Algebraic geometry and differential topology (head: András Némethi)
 Algebraic Logic (head: Hajnal Andréka)
 Analysis (head: András Kroó)
 Combinatorics and discrete mathematics (head: Ervin Győri)
 Geometry (head: Gábor Fejes Tóth)
 Number theory (head: János Pintz)
 Probability & statistics (head: Péter Major)
 Set theory and general topology (head: Lajos Soukup)
 Cryptology (head: Gábor Tardos)
 Financial Mathematics (Momentum research group of the Hungarian Academy of Sciences, head: Miklós Rásonyi)
 Groups and Graphs (Momentum research group of the Hungarian Academy of Sciences, European Research Council research group, head: Miklós Abért)
 Limits of Structures (Momentum research group of the Hungarian Academy of Sciences, European Research Council research group, head: Balázs Szegedy)
 Low Dimensional Topology (Momentum research group of the Hungarian Academy of Sciences, European Research Council research group, head: András Stipsicz)
 Regularity (European Research Council research group, head: Endre Szemerédi)
 Discrete and Convex Geometry (European Research Council research group, head: Imre Bárány)
 Didactics (head: Péter Juhász)

Name
The institute's name originally was Applied Mathematics Institute of the HAS then Mathematical Research Institute of the HAS. It obtained its current name on July 1, 1999, after Alfréd Rényi, the eminent mathematician who founded the institute and was its director for 20 years.

Some of the notable researchers
 Imre Bárány, combinatorialist, geometer, member of the Hungarian Academy of Sciences
 Imre Csiszár, information theorist, Shannon Award, Dobrushin Prize, member of the Hungarian Academy of Sciences
 Zoltán Füredi, combinatorialist, member of the Hungarian Academy of Sciences
 Tibor Gallai, combinatorialist
 András Hajnal, set theorist, member of the Hungarian Academy of Sciences
 István Juhász, working in set theoretical topology, member of the Hungarian Academy of Sciences
 Imre Lakatos, philosopher of mathematics and science
 Péter Major, probability theorist, member of the Hungarian Academy of Sciences
 Katalin Marton, information theorist, Shannon Award
 Péter Pál Pálfy, algebra, member of the Hungarian Academy of Sciences
 János Pintz, number theorist, AMS Cole Prize, member of the Hungarian Academy of Sciences
 Lajos Pósa, combinatorialist, educator
 László Pyber, algebra, member of the Hungarian Academy of Sciences
 Imre Z. Ruzsa, number theorist, member of the Hungarian Academy of Sciences
 Miklós Simonovits, combinatorialist, member of the Hungarian Academy of Sciences
 Vera T. Sós, combinatorialist, member of the Hungarian Academy of Sciences
 András Stipsicz, algebraic geometer, member of the Hungarian Academy of Sciences
 Endre Szemerédi, combinatorialist, Abel Prize 2012., member of the Hungarian Academy of Sciences
 Gábor Tardos, combinatorialist
 Gábor Tusnády, probability theory, member of the Hungarian Academy of Sciences

Directors
 Alfréd Rényi (1950–1970)
 László Fejes Tóth (1970–1982)
 András Hajnal (1982–1992)
 Domokos Szász (1993–1995)
 Gyula O. H. Katona (1996–2005)
 Péter Pál Pálfy (2006–2018).
 András Stipsicz (2019–).

External links
 The homepage of the institute

Hungarian Academy of Sciences
Mathematical institutes
Research institutes in Hungary